Lake Emanda ( or Эманджа, Emanca) is a freshwater lake in Tomponsky District, Sakha Republic, Russia. The lake is located in a desolate area where there is no permanent population and few visitors. There are burbot, pike and grayling in its waters.

Geography
Lake Emanda is the largest lake of the Yana Plateau.  

The Seen River (Сеен), a right hand tributary of the Derbeke, is the outflow of the lake.

See also
List of lakes of Russia
Yana-Oymyakon Highlands

References

External links
озеро эманда на севере томпонского, летом туда можно ли добратся? 
Geographical places in Sakha (Yakutiya), Russia
Emanda